Land Speed Record is the debut full-length record by Hüsker Dü, released in January 1982 by New Alliance Records. It was recorded live on August 15, 1981, at the 7th Street Entry, a venue in Minneapolis, Minnesota.  The album is a fast and furious hardcore workout that bears almost no resemblance to the melodic post-hardcore that the band became known for in the mid '80s. The title has a  triple meaning, referring to 1) the band's ability to play as fast as they could (there are 17 songs crammed into 26½ minutes) 2) their penchant for [amphetamine] pills and 3) the play-on-words that it is a "record," an album.

History
Hüsker Dü's August 1981 concert was recorded straight to 4-track soundboard tape on a three hundred dollar budget.  Once the band had taped it they realized they lacked the financial means to release the album. Friend of the band and member of Minutemen, Mike Watt, offered to put out the album on his label, New Alliance. The original LP release on New Alliance contained an insert with lyrics and upcoming tour dates. The album got a European release on Alternative Tentacles in the UK.

The album was reissued in 1987 on SST Records on compact disc and LP. Like Hüsker Dü's other releases, Land Speed Record has not been remastered to alter the LP's sound for the compact disc release. The band's ongoing royalty disputes with SST have been given as the cause for not having a unique CD edition issued. Ken Shipley of The Numero Group has noted that the original tape was stolen from the band's van. The SST CD contains only two tracks, one for each side of the original LP.

The Numero Group's 2017 box set Savage Young Dü includes an alternate version of the same set, recorded at a Twin/Tone Records showcase two weeks later.

Track listing
Side One – 12:27
 "All Tensed Up" (Bob Mould) – 2:02
 "Don't Try to Call" (Mould) – 1:30
 "I'm Not Interested" (Grant Hart) – 1:31
 "Guns at My School" (Mould) – 0:55
 "Push the Button" (Hart) – 1:48
 "Gilligan's Island" (Hart) – 1:23
 "M.T.C." (Greg Norton) – 1:09
 "Don't Have a Life" (Norton) – 2:09

Side Two – 14:08
 "Bricklayer" (Mould) – 0:53
 "Tired of Doing Things" (Hart) – 0:58
 "You're Naive" (Mould) – 0:53
 "Strange Week" (Hart) – 0:57
 "Do the Bee" (Hart) – 1:49
 "Big Sky" (Mould) – 0:57
 "Ultracore" (Mould) – 0:47
 "Let's Go Die" (Norton) – 1:26
 "Data Control" (Hart) – 5:28

Personnel
Adapted from the album's liner notes.

Hüsker Dü
Bob Mould – guitar, vocals
Greg Norton – bass, vocals
Grant Hart – drums, vocals
Technical
Hüsker Dü – producer, mixdown
Steve Fjelstad – remote mix, mixdown
Terry Katzman – remote mix assistant
Doug Remley – remote mix assistant
Wayne B. Case – remote mix assistant
Fake Name Grafx – artwork

References

Hüsker Dü albums
1982 debut albums
Albums produced by Bob Mould
1982 live albums
New Alliance Records live albums
SST Records live albums